Nandini Das is professor of Early Modern Literature and Culture in the English faculty at the University of Oxford. She is a specialist in Shakespeare studies, Renaissance romance writing, early travel literature, and encounters between different cultures.

Early life
Nandini Das grew up in India and studied the sciences at school, and after working as a software programmer in the publishing industry for a year, decided to return to academic research. Aged about 10, she was inspired by seeing Vanessa Redgrave in William Shakespeare's As You Like It on Indian television. She earned a BA in English from Jadavpur University in Kolkata, India, after which she moved to Britain on a Rhodes scholarship to study English at University College, Oxford (BA). She subsequently earned her M.Phil and PhD at Trinity College, Cambridge.

Career
Das was professor of English literature at the University of Liverpool until October 2019, when she became a Tutorial Fellow at Exeter College, Oxford and Professor of Early Modern Literature and Culture in the English faculty at Oxford.  Her research relates to cultural and intellectual history for the period 1600 to 1750 including fiction, accounts of early travel and encounters between different cultures.

She has edited a scholarly edition of Robert Greene's Planetomachia (1585) in 2007 and is the volume editor for Elizabethan Levant trade and South Asia of Richard Hakluyt's 'Principall Navigations, Voyages, Traffikes, and Discoveries of the English Nation.

She is project director of the Travel, Transculturality and Identity in England, c.1550-1700 (TIDE) project.

She is a fellow of the Higher Education Academy, a member of the council of Research England, and a member of the Peer Review College of Britain's Arts and Humanities Research Council.

In September 2018, she presented Tales of Tudor Travel: The Explorer's Handbook on BBC4 television.

Selected publications

References

Living people
Academics of the University of Liverpool
Jadavpur University alumni
British academics of English literature
Indian emigrants to England
Alumni of Trinity College, Cambridge
Alumni of University College, Oxford
British women academics
Year of birth missing (living people)